Ján is a Slovak form of the name John.

Famous people named Ján 
 Ján Bahýľ, inventor
 Ján Čapkovič, football player
 Ján Čarnogurský, former Prime Minister of Slovakia
 Ján Cikker, composer
 Ján Ďurica, football player
 Ján Figeľ, European Commissioner
 Ján Golian, soldier, military leader of Slovak National Uprising
 Ján Hollý, poet and translator
 Ján Kadár, film director
 Ján Kocian, football player
 Ján Kollár, writer
 Ján Kožiak, football player
 Ján Lašák, ice-hockey goalkeeper
 Ján Lunter, Slovak politician
 Ján Mucha, Slovak footballer
 Ján Packa, handball player
 Ján Slota, politician
 Ján Šťastný (hockey player) (born 1982), Slovak hockey player
 Ján Svorada, cyclist
 Ján Zvara, high jumper

Other 
Liptovský Ján, village and municipality in Slovakia

See also 
Jan (disambiguation)

References

Given names
Slovak masculine given names